Hume's bush warbler (Horornis brunnescens) is a species of bush warbler (family Cettiidae). It was formerly included in the "Old World warbler" assemblage.

It is found in the Himalayas of Nepal and India.

It was formerly considered conspecific with the yellow-bellied bush warbler.

The name commemorates the British naturalist Allan Octavian Hume who worked in India.

References

Hume's bush warbler
Birds of the Himalayas
Hume's bush warbler